Thirumalagiri mandal is one of the 23 mandals in Suryapet district of the Indian state of Telangana. It is under the administration of Suryapet revenue division with its headquarters at Thirumalagiri. It is bounded by  Nagaram mandal towards South, Thungathurthy mandal towards East, Yadadri district towards West, Jangaon district towards North.

Geography
It is in the 357 m elevation(altitude) .

Demographics
Thirumalagiri mandal is having population of 38,633. Thirumalagiri is the largest and Siddisamudram is the smallest village in the mandal.

Villages
 census of India, the mandal has 12 settlements. 
The settlements in the mandal are listed below:

Notes
(†) Mandal headquarter

References

Mandals in Suryapet district